Gangsters 2: Vendetta is a 2001 PC video game. It was developed by Hothouse Creations, with Eidos Interactive as publishers. Gangsters 2 was designed by both Peter Moreland and Rob Davies. The game is the sequel to Gangsters: Organized Crime, also published by Eidos. While the original game focused on a nameless character, the sequel tells the story of an aspiring gangster who seeks to take revenge on his father's murderers while carving out a place for himself in the final years of Prohibition.

Story
Set from late 1928 to early 1929, the game follows a young Italian-American mobster named Joey Bane. Bane's father, a prominent mob boss, is murdered in a power struggle with a rival mob controlling most of the state of Temperance (the same fictional setting as Gangsters). The man directly responsible for ordering the senior Bane's death is boss Frankie "Hammer" Constantine. Bane is mentored by his uncle, who survived the assassination of his older brother and gives his nephew (and thus, the player) advice on how to set up his own rackets and rebuild the family's criminal empire. An early mission has Bane exacting revenge on the men who carried out his father's murder, only to learn that Constantine was the one who actually sent them. Bane slowly expands his empire into other parts of the state, increasing his power and influence by eliminating rival gangsters, associates, and members of the Constantine family while forging alliances with their enemies, until he can finally take down Constantine, avenge his father, and take his rightful place as the most powerful crime lord in Temperance.

End scenes
In contrast to its predecessor, Gangsters 2 was noted for having special end scenes if the player loses. Icons displaying the game's outcome appear in the game's high score section depending on the losing scene, with the exception of a "Victory" icon should the player win the game. End scenes include:

Execution: Bane is sent to the electric chair and put to death if the player is arrested and the crimes committed (such as a high body count or extensive destruction of property) are acute enough to warrant a death sentence.
Death: If the player is assassinated by rival gangsters, Bane's freshly carved tombstone is shown in the middle of a loud thunderstorm.
Imprisonment: If the player is arrested but their crimes are not severe enough to warrant execution, Bane is sentenced to a lengthy term in prison, with game then showing him being locked away as the sounds of shouting prisoners are heard.
Bankruptcy: If the player runs out of money due to mismanagement or destruction of their rackets and loses the loyalty of their hoods, a now-penniless Bane is shown angrily leaving his empty office as a framed picture of his father falls to the floor and shatters.

Gameplay
The game is primarily a strategy game, utilizing a point and click interface. Each gangster (or "hood") the player controls as Bane can control their own four subordinates to assist in jobs and firefights. Hoods can use vehicles to reach targets faster, attempt drive-by shootings, and transport illegal goods for sale. Weapons can be upgraded, giving hoods better firepower than their opponents. Businesses must be bought, sold, and taken over from rival gangs to bring in money, and the player must set up their own illegal businesses, such as breweries, gambling dens, and brothels, to preserve their control and influence in conquered territories.

The player is given regular objectives to fulfill. They range from simple tasks such as setting up new rackets to more difficult missions like seizing the businesses of rival gangs, carrying out kidnappings, and committing murders. Objectives that are assigned to seasoned hoods with the right equipment usually go well, while a lack of preparation and proper planning can result in the player losing hoods and attracting unnecessary attention from the police.

With money from their rackets and businesses, players can purchase a number of different automobiles and weapons, employ business specialists to help manage their rackets, and hire special hoods such as hitmen for specific objectives.

There are five different cars available for purchase as well as a range of guns: revolvers, dual pistols, rifles, shotguns, and tommy guns. Bombs can also be purchased for attacks and assassinations, but only by a hood with the bomb skill. Skills can be leveled up before starting each mission by a limited amount, from improving the combat and stealth skills of hoods to their special abilities, unique to each hood; examples include "bombing", "bank robbing", "getaway driving", or "kidnapping". You can also level up the business skills of racket managers, increasing their overall profits.

Reception

The game received "mixed" reviews according to the review aggregation website Metacritic. Daniel Erickson of NextGen called it "Another bad stab at a goodfella's idea."

References

External links
Gangsters 2 at Trygames (archived)

2001 video games
Eidos Interactive games
Hothouse Creations games
Multiplayer and single-player video games
Organized crime video games
Video game sequels
Video games developed in the United Kingdom
Video games set in the 1920s
Video games set in the United States
Windows games
Windows-only games
Works about the American Mafia